This is a list of schools in Southampton in the English county of Hampshire.

State-funded schools

Primary schools

Banister Primary School
Bassett Green Primary School
Beechwood Junior School
Bevois Town Primary School
Bitterne CE Primary School
Bitterne Manor Primary School
Bitterne Park Primary School
Fairisle Infant and Nursery School
Fairisle Junior School
Foundry Lane Primary School
Freemantle CE Community Academy
Glenfield Infant School
Harefield Primary School
Highfield CE Primary School
Hightown Primary School
Hollybrook Infant School
Hollybrook Junior School
Holy Family RC Primary School
Hope Community School
Kanes Hill Primary School
Ludlow Infant Academy
Ludlow Junior School
Mansbridge Primary School
Mansel Park Primary School
Mason Moor Primary School
Maytree Nursery and Infants' School
Moorlands Primary School
Mount Pleasant Junior School
Newlands Primary School
Oakwood Primary School
Portswood Primary School
Redbridge Primary School
St Denys Primary School
St John's Primary and Nursery School
St Mark's CE Primary School
St Mary's CE Primary School
St Monica Primary School
St Patrick’s RC Primary School
Shirley Infant School
Shirley Junior School
Shirley Warren Primary and Nursery School
Sholing Infant School
Sholing Junior School
Sinclair Primary and Nursery School
Springhill RC Primary School
Swaythling Primary School
Tanners Brook Primary School
Thornhill Primary School
Townhill Infant School
Townhill Junior School
Valentine Primary School
Western Park Primary School
Weston Shore Infant School
Woolston Infant School
Wordsworth Primary School

Secondary schools

Bitterne Park School
Cantell School
Oasis Academy Lord's Hill
Oasis Academy Mayfield
Oasis Academy Sholing
Redbridge Community School
Regents Park Community College
St Anne's Catholic School
St George Catholic College
Upper Shirley High School
Weston Secondary School
Woodlands Community College

Special and alternative schools 

The Cedar School
Compass School
Great Oaks School
The Polygon School
Rosewood Free School
Southampton Hospital School
Springwell School
Vermont School

Further education 
Itchen College
Richard Taunton Sixth Form College
Southampton City College

Independent schools

Primary and preparatory schools
Charlton House Independent School
The Gregg Preparatory School

Senior and all-through schools
Fitrah SIPS
The Gregg School
King Edward VI School

Special and alternative schools
The Serendipity School
Yarrow Heights School

External links 
List of schools - Southampton City Council

Southampton
Schools in Southampton
Schools
Lists of buildings and structures in Hampshire